Senator Chase may refer to:

Members of the United States Senate
Dudley Chase (1771–1846), U.S. Senator from Vermont from 1813 to 1817 and from 1825 to 1831
Salmon P. Chase (1808–1873), U.S. Senator from Ohio from 1849 to 1855

United States state senate members
Arthur E. Chase (1930–2015), Massachusetts State Senate
Champion S. Chase (1820–1898), Wisconsin State Senate
De Lanson Alson Newton Chase (1875–1953), Kansas State Senate
Enoch Chase (1809–1892), Wisconsin State Senate
John B. Chase (1872–1960), Wisconsin State Senate
Maralyn Chase (born 1942), Washington State Senate
Norton Chase (1861–1922), New York State Senate
Roland E. Chase (1867–1948), Virginia State Senate
Stephen Chase (politician) (fl. 1840s), Maine State Senate
Warren Chase (1813–1891), Wisconsin State Senate and California State Senate